The Cosmotron was a particle accelerator, specifically a proton synchrotron, at Brookhaven National Laboratory.  Its construction was approved by the U.S. Atomic Energy Commission in 1948, reaching its full energy in 1953, and continuing to run until 1966. It was dismantled in 1969.

It was the first particle accelerator to impart kinetic energy in the range of GeV to a single particle, accelerating protons to 3.3 GeV. It was also the first accelerator to allow the extraction of the particle beam for experiments located physically outside the accelerator. It was used to observe a number of mesons previously seen only in cosmic rays, and to make the first discoveries of heavy, unstable particles (called V particles at the time) leading to the experimental confirmation of the theory of associated production of strange particles. It was the first accelerator that was able to produce all positive and negative mesons known to exist in cosmic rays. Its discoveries include the first vector meson.

The name chosen for the synchrotron was Cosmitron (representing an ambition to produce cosmic rays) but was changed to Cosmotron to sound like the cyclotron. The beam size of 64 × 15 cm and an energy goal of about 3 GeV determined the machine
parameters. The synchrotron had a 75-foot/22.9-meter diameter. It consisted of 288 magnets each weighing 6 tons and providing up to 1.5 T, forming four curved sections. The range of field change was kept within limits by first accelerating particles to an intermediate energy in another accelerator and then injected into the Cosmotron. The straight sections without magnets were worrisome because there was no focusing and the betatron oscillations would change suddenly and might swing wildly. But, all these major problems were overcome.

References

External links 

 BNL-Cosmotron experiment record on INSPIRE-HEP
 Cosomtron Magnet Lamina at the Smithsonian Museum of Natural History
History from BNL website 
 BNL website on BNL's 60th anniversary

Brookhaven National Laboratory
Particle physics facilities
Particle experiments